Kanal 2 is a privately owned Estonian television channel. Its literal name in English is "Channel 2".

The channel was established by Ilmar Taska. The channel began broadcasting on 1 October 1993.

History
The channel started broadcasting on October 1, 1993, the first program seen on the new network being the Estonian animated film Kapsapea (Cabbage Head). The channel in its initial phase broadcast on weekends, beginning December 17 that year, week-round broadcasts started.

Programmes 
The list might not reflect the current lineup of television shows.

Estonian 
 Baar (The Bar)
 Jumal tänatud, et sa siin oled! (Thank God You're Here)
 Kelgukoerad (crime series)
 Kuldvillak (Jeopardy!)
 Kuum hind (The Price Is Right)
 Ma näen su häält (I Can See Your Voice)
 Reporter (daily news program)
 Reporter+ (weekly news program)
 Saladused (Secrets)
 Tantsud tähtedega (Dancing with the Stars)
 Tõehetk (Nada más que la verdad)
 Ühikarotid (Estonian teen drama)

Foreign

Children Shows 
2 Stupid Dogs
Aaahh!!! Real Monsters
Alvin and the Chipmunks
Animaniacs
Biker Mice from Mars
CatDog
Catscratch
Chaplin & Co
DuckTales
Miss Moon
Mr. Bean
Oggy and the Cockroaches
Rocko's Modern Life
Squirrel Boy
Super 4
Teletubbies

Telenovelas 
Acorralada
Amor Descarado
Amores de mercado
Bianca – Wege zum Glück
Contra viento y marea
Destilando Amor
En nombre del amor
Gata Salvaje
Julia – Wege zum Glück
Mar de amor
Milagros
Olvidarte jamás
Rosangélica
Soñadoras
Victoria

Comedy 
Andy Richter Controls the Universe
Desperate Housewives
Due South
Friends
Hang Time
Inspector Rex
Joey
Las Vegas
Married... with Children
Men in Trees
Police Academy: The Series
Pushing Daisies
Sabrina, the Teenage Witch
The Middle
Two and a Half Men
Two Guys and a Girl
Ugly Betty
What I Like About You

Animation 
Futurama

Soap Operas 
Home and Away
Santa Barbara

Drama Series 
90210
Alcatraz
Bad Girls
Brothers & Sisters
C-16: FBI
Charmed
Chicago Fire
Close to Home
Cold Case
Criminal Minds
Da Vinci's Inquest
Dexter
Dirt
Everwood
Footballers' Wives
Footballers' Wives: Extra Time
Fringe
Gossip Girl
Heartbreak High
Heartland
Higher Ground
Highlander: The Series
Indian Summers
Invasion
Judging Amy
Kyle XY
Locked Up
Lost
MacGyver
Major Crimes
McLeod's Daughters
Medical Investigation
Medium
Mile High
Muhteşem Yüzyıl
Muhteşem Yüzyıl: Kösem
NCIS
NCIS: Los Angeles
A Nero Wolfe Mystery
Nip/Tuck
Nowhere Man
Person of Interest
Renegade
Rizzoli & Isles
Rome
Russian Dolls: Sex Trade
Satisfaction
Silk Stalkings
Supernatural
Terminator: The Sarah Connor Chronicles
The Blacklist
The Border
The Closer
The Following
The Immortal
The Mentalist
The Mountain
The O.C.
The Shield
To Have & to Hold
V
Walker, Texas Ranger
Without a Trace
Young Lions

Reality 
America's Got Talent
America's Next Top Model
Forensic Investigators
I Shouldn't Be Alive
Ladette to Lady
My Bare Lady
Nanny 911
Pussycat Dolls Present: The Search for the Next Doll
So You Think You Can Dance
Supernanny
The Amazing Race
The Bachelorette
The Cut
The Virtual Revolution
Zero Hour

References

External links
 

Television channels in Estonia
Television channels and stations established in 1993
1993 establishments in Estonia
Mass media in Tallinn